Seven ships of the Royal Navy have borne the name HMS Penguin. A penguin is a flightless aquatic bird.

 was a 20-gun post ship. She was originally launched in 1731 as Dolphine, then renamed Firebrand, and finally renamed Penguin in 1757. The French captured her in 1760.
 was an 8-gun sloop building in 1772. She was not completed and was broken up in 1775.
 a 10-gun schooner purchased in Newfoundland and wrecked in a storm in ther Bay of Bulls in 1778
HMS Penguin was a 16-gun brig. She was originally named HMS Comeet before being renamed to HMS Penguin in 1796. She was sold in 1809.
 was a 19-gun  launched in 1813. The American ship-sloop  captured her in 1815 off Tristan da Cunha and afterwards scuttled her as Penguin was so damaged as to be of no value as a prize.
 was a 6-gun packet brig laid down in 1838. In 1858 she became a coastguard watchvessel. She was renamed WV.31 in 1863 and sold in 1873.
 was a  launched in 1860 at Liverpool. She was sold in 1870 for scrap.
 was an  launched in 1876. In 1890 she became a survey ship and in 1908 a depot ship. She was transferred to the Royal Australian Navy in 1913 and sold in 1924. She became a crane hulk and was burnt in 1960.

See also
 , for ships and shore facilities of the Royal Australian Navy that have borne the same name

References

Royal Navy ship names